Tacna is the largest of four provinces in the Department of Tacna in southern Peru located on the border with Chile and Bolivia. Its capital is Tacna.

Geography 
The Tacna Province is bounded to the north by the Jorge Basadre Province and the Tarata Province, to the east by Chile and Bolivia, to the south by Chile and to the west by the Pacific Ocean.

The Barroso mountain range traverses the province. Some of the highest mountains of the province are listed below:

Political division
The province is divided into 11 districts (singular: distrito), each of which is headed by a mayor (alcalde):

Alto de la Alianza
Calana
Ciudad Nueva
Coronel Gregorio Albarracín Lanchipa
Inclán
Pachía
Palca
Pocollay
Sama
La Yarada-Los Palos District
Tacna

Ethnic groups 
The province is inhabited by indigenous citizens of Aymara and Quechua descent. Spanish, however, is the language which the majority of the population (80.88%) learnt to speak in childhood, 16.34% of the residents started speaking using the Aymara language and 2.55% using Quechua (2007 Peru Census).

See also 
 Wila Wilani

Sources

External links

  Official website of the Tacna Province

Provinces of the Tacna Region